Józef Brodowski may refer to:

 Józef Brodowski the Elder (c. 1775/81–1853), Polish painter
 Józef Brodowski the Younger (1828–1900), Polish painter, son of Antoni Brodowski

See also 
 Brodowski